Horsfieldia atjehensis is a species of plant in the family Myristicaceae. It is endemic to Sumatra.

References

atjehensis
Endemic flora of Sumatra
Trees of Sumatra
Vulnerable plants
Taxonomy articles created by Polbot